The Sober & Lonely Institute for Contemporary Art (S&L) was formed by Lauren von Gogh and Robyn Cook on April 1, 2011. The institute is currently mobile, with a permanent library (the Sober & Lonely Library for Science Fiction, Feminism and Misc - SLLSFFM) housed in a cupboard in New Doornfontein, Johannesburg, South Africa. 
The institute is an extension of Sober & Lonely's artistic practice to create a platform of sharing and engagement between like-minded people and organizations, functioning as a space for research and experimentation and hosting artists in residence.

S & L has also curated shows at the Ithuba Arts Fund and the Visual Arts Network of South Africa, and was featured in the "Bright Young Things" section of Art South Africa.

S & L has completed art residencies in New York, Finland and The Netherlands.

The Sober & Lonely Running Club is an extension of the Institute particularly focused on exploring the artistic possibilities of running, and collaborated in 2012 and 2013 for synchronized runs with the art center Machine Project in Los Angeles, California.

References

External links 

2011 establishments in South Africa
Artist-run centres
Organisations based in Johannesburg
South African art
Cultural organisations based in South Africa
Culture of Johannesburg